Abdelkrim Kerroum (25 March 1936 – 9 January 2022) was an Algerian footballer who played as an attacking midfielder. He was a member of the FLN football team. Kerroum died on 9 January 2022, at the age of 85.

References

External links
 

1936 births
2022 deaths
21st-century Algerian people
People from Saïda
Algerian footballers
Association football midfielders
Algeria international footballers
FLN football team players
MC Saïda players
Ligue 1 players
FC Sète 34 players
ES Troyes AC players
Algerian expatriate footballers
Algerian expatriate sportspeople in France
Expatriate footballers in France